Spikenard, also called nard, nardin, and muskroot, is a class of aromatic amber-colored essential oil derived from Nardostachys jatamansi, a flowering plant in the honeysuckle family which grows in the Himalayas of Nepal, China, and India. The oil has been used over centuries as a perfume, a traditional medicine, or in religious ceremonies across a wide territory from India to Europe. Historically, the name nard has also referred to essential oils derived from other species including the closely related valerian genus, as well as Spanish lavender; these cheaper, more common plants have been used in perfume-making, and sometimes to adulterate true spikenard.

Etymology 

The name "nard" is derived from Latin nardus, from Ancient Greek νάρδος (nárdos). This word may ultimately derive either from Sanskrit नलद (nálada, Indian spikenard), or from Naarda, an ancient Assyrian city (possibly the modern town of Dohuk, Iraq). The "spike" in the name refers to the inflorescence or flowering stem of the plant.

Description
Nardostachys jatamansi is a flowering plant of the honeysuckle family that grows in the Himalayas of Nepal, China, and India. In bloom, the plant grows to about 1 meter (3 ft) in height and has small, pink, bell-shaped flowers. Its rhizomes can be crushed and distilled into an intensely aromatic, amber-colored essential oil with a thick consistency. Nard oil is used as a perfume, an incense, and as an herbal medicine.

History
In ancient Rome, nardus was used to flavor wine, and occurs frequently in the recipes of Apicius. During the early Roman empire, nardus was the main ingredient of a perfume (unguentum nardinum).

Pliny's Natural History lists several species of nardus used in making perfume and spiced wine: Indian nard, a stinking nard called 'ozaenitidos' which is not used, a false nard ('pseudo-nard') with which true nard is adulterated, and several herbs local to Europe and the Eastern Mediterranean which are also called nardus, namely Syrian nard, Gallic nard, Cretan nard (also called 'agrion' or 'phun'), field nard (also called 'bacchar'), wild nard (also called 'asaron'), and Celtic nard. Celtic nard is the only species Pliny mentions which he does not describe when listing the species of nard in book 12 of Natural History suggesting it is synonymous with another species, probably with the species Pliny refers to as 'hirculus', a plant Pliny attests to growing in the same region as Gallic nard and which he says is used to adulterate Gallic nard. Both are widely assumed to be cultivars or varieties of Valeriana celtica.

Indian nard refers to Nardostachys jatamansi, stinking nard possibly to Allium victorialis, false nard to Lavandula stoechas, Syrian nard to Cymbopogon nardus, Gallic nard to Valeriana celtica, Cretan nard to Valeriana italica (syn. V. dioscoridis, V. tuberosa), and wild nard to Asarum europaeum. Field nard, or 'bacchar', has not been conclusively identified and must not be confused with species now called "baccharises" referring to species native to North America.

Culture 

Spikenard is mentioned in the Bible being used for its fragrance.

In the Hispanic iconographic tradition of the Catholic Church, the spikenard is used to represent Saint Joseph.  The Vatican has said that the coat of arms of Pope Francis includes the spikenard in reference to Saint Joseph.

Nard (Italian ) is also mentioned in the Inferno of Dante Alighieri's Divine Comedy:

References

Further reading
 Dalby, Andrew, "Spikenard" in Alan Davidson, The Oxford Companion to Food, 2nd ed. by Tom Jaine (Oxford: Oxford University Press, 2006. ).

Perfume ingredients
Spices
Incense material
Plants in the Bible